The Smile of a Child (a.k.a. A Smile of a Child) is a 1911 American short silent drama film directed by D. W. Griffith and starring Blanche Sweet.

Cast
 Blanche Sweet as The Peasant Woman
 Edwin August
 W. Chrystie Miller
 Baden Powell as The Child

Plot
The description of the film from trade journal The Moving Picture World was "Here is illustrated the influence of the smile of a child. It makes an ill-natured prince pleasant, and later saves its mother."

See also
 D. W. Griffith filmography
 Blanche Sweet filmography

References

External links

1911 films
American silent short films
Biograph Company films
American black-and-white films
1911 drama films
1911 short films
Films directed by D. W. Griffith
Silent American drama films
1910s American films